The hełm wz. 31 (helmet, 1931 pattern) was the basic combat helmet of the Polish Army before the outbreak of World War II and during the Invasion of Poland. The helmet became the basic type of combat headgear for Polish military formations in 1930s and during the early stages of World War II. It was also exported to Persia, Albania and Republican Spain. By September 1939 approximately 320,000 copies were delivered to the Polish Army. 

While it was not the most common helmet in Polish service during World War II (in 1939 most of the mobilised soldiers were issued old French Adrian helmets), it became somewhat iconic and widely regarded in Poland as one of the symbols of Polish resistance. Because of this, the hełm wz.67 designed in the late 1960s was based on the wz.31's silhouette.

Design 

The wz.31 was an all-metal one-piece helmet with a distinctive peaked visor and a slight "skirt." It was covered with either plain or Salamandra matte paint. Most helmets were covered with a thick layer of lead tetroxide and then painted with standard all-military khaki, with some of them painted grey, greyish green or navy blue (the latter worn by the police). The weight of the complete set with inner lining was approximately 1.3 kg. The helmet could be worn with the visor backwards, which was used by artillery officers for increased visibility and better peripheral vision.

History and usage 
After the end of World War I Poland seized large quantities of helmets from other countries formerly occupying its territory. Among the most widely used was the German M1918 helmet, better known as the Stahlhelm. Large numbers of French Adrian helmets were also being used. However, as the shape of the helmet was one of the most distinctive marks on the battlefield, already in 1919 the Polish Army started working on a genuine Polish helmet, distinct from those used by the armies of surrounding countries and offering better protection than the German helmet. 

The initial work on a new helmet was directed by the IBMU institute in Warsaw, with the chief engineer being Leonard Krauze. The design team created an outer shell, but the design process came to a halt in mid-1920s due to problems with the inner lining and production process preparation. It was decided to purchase a ready-made design or use a technological process developed in another country. Swedish Eskilstuna Stal Pressing AB steel mill was chosen as the contractor and a Polish commission spent several weeks observing the Swedish technology. In the end the Polish ministry of military affairs decided to buy a license for Swedish helmet suspension and liners, and to design a custom outer shell. 

The shell was based on an earlier Polish design, the hełm wz. 30 which never entered serial production. The most notable modification included liquidation of the horn-like ventilator lugs, similar to the ones found on early German helmets. 300 copies of the modernised design were ordered for testing and were then extensively modified by the Pokój steel mill, the Warsaw-based Arms Factory No. 2 and the Wolbrom-based Ideal works. Simultaneously, the Warsaw-based "W. Karpiński and M. Leppert" factory designed a new type of grainy non-glossy paint to eliminate light reflection. The new paint was patented under the name of "Salamandra" (salamander) and accepted by the ministry.

The tests of the modernised 1930 design were successful and by September 1932 the first 120 copies were made by the Bismarck and Silesia steel mills, the latter equipped with a complete production line of German World War I Stahlhelm helmets. Further tests at the Infantry Training Centre in Rembertów near Warsaw led to further minor modifications. Finally the Ministry chose two steel mills as contractors for serial production. The Kielce-based Huta Ludwików factory started serial production of helmet shells from a nickel-chrome-molybdenum steel alloy provided by the Baildon Steel Mill. At the same time some of the helmets were being produced from less durable manganese steel. Due to project's secrecy it was officially referred to in military purchase orders as "kettle production". Initially costing 21,70 złoty apiece, with time the price dropped to 16,50 złoty. 

The first batches of serially-produced helmets entered field service in January 1933. Initially issued to infantry and artillery, in time it was also provided to the Polish Navy and Border Protection Corps. The Border Guards and State Police were provided with a variant of the wz.31 helmet with a large (10 centimetres in diameter) White Eagle adorning the forehead. However, at the end of the 1930s it was determined that the standard Polish wz. 31 helmet was unsuitable for tank troops and motorized units; while offering decent protection, it was too large and heavy. Because of that most of motorised units continued to use German Stahlhelms, while the cavalry used the French Adrian Helmet. The latter was also issued to many of the units mobilised in 1939.

Variants

Export version 
The export variants were identical to the original wz.31 helmet except for the paint: instead of standard khaki used in Poland the Spanish Republic used black mat.

hełm wz. 31/50 

While the production of the wz.31 ended with the German and Soviet occupation of Poland in 1939, the Kielce-based Huta Ludwików retained large numbers of original helmet shells in its warehouses. After the war production did not resume and instead the Polish Army was equipped with Soviet Ssh-39 helmets. However, the remaining wz.31 shells were fitted with lining from German M1935 helmet and issued to various military colleges.

References
  Kijak J., Hełmy Wojska Polskiego 1917–2000, Wydawnictwo Bellona, Warsaw 2004, .

External links

  Hełm wz. 31 at przeciwlotnicza.pl

Combat helmets of Poland
World War II military equipment of Poland
Military equipment introduced in the 1930s